St Thomas Aquinas School may refer to:
 St. Thomas Aquinas Primary School, Bulawayo, Zimbabwe
 St. Thomas Aquinas School, Witbank, a school in South Africa

See also
 St. Thomas Aquinas Secondary School (disambiguation)
 St. Thomas Aquinas High School (disambiguation)
 St Thomas School (disambiguation)